"Trompeta" is a song by French DJ, record producer and singer Willy William. It was released through Scorpio Music on 18 February 2022 as a single. The song samples the 1989 song "Infinity" by British DJ and producer Guru Josh.

Charts

Weekly charts

Year-end charts

Certifications

References

2022 songs
2022 singles
Willy William songs